Roger Springer (born June 15, 1962, in Caddo, Oklahoma) is an American country music artist. Springer's only single as a solo artist, "The Right One Left," was released in 1992 on MCA Nashville and peaked at No. 69 on the Billboard Hot Country Singles & Tracks chart.

In 1998, Springer formed the country music trio Springer! with Shara Johnson and Joe Manuel. Their first single, "Don't Try to Find Me," peaked at No. 64 on the Hot Country Singles & Tracks chart. A second single, "Ain't Nothing but a Cloud," was released in 1999 but failed to chart. Renamed The Roger Springer Band, Giant released the trio's eponymous debut album in July 1999 shortly before they disbanded.

As a songwriter, Springer has co-written single releases by Mark Chesnutt ("I Might Even Quit Lovin' You," "It's a Little Too Late," "Let It Rain," "Thank God for Believers"), Sammy Kershaw ("Matches") and Love and Theft ("Dancing in Circles").

Discography

Albums

Singles

Music videos

References

External links
[ allmusic ((( Roger Springer > Overview )))]

1962 births
American country singer-songwriters
American male singer-songwriters
Giant Records (Warner) artists
Living people
MCA Records artists